Blaga may refer to:

Blaga (name)
Blaga, a village in Dealu Morii Commune, Bacău County
Blaga, a village in Schitu Duca Commune, Iași County
4891 Blaga, main-belt asteroid